The Classic Brugge–De Panne is a road cycling race in Belgium in late March. Since 2018 it is raced over two days with a men's race on Wednesday and a women's race on Thursday. Both races start in Bruges and finish in the seaside resort of De Panne.

The women's event is included in the UCI Women's World Tour; the men's race was part of the UCI Europe Tour as a 1.HC event, but was promoted to the UCI World Tour as a 1.WT event in 2019.  The 2020 edition was rescheduled due to the COVID-19 pandemic.

History

Three Days of De Panne
The Three Days of De Panne was created in 1977 as a three-day cycling event in the week leading up to the Tour of Flanders, in late March or early April. The first day was usually a hilly stage starting in De Panne and finishing in the Flemish Ardennes. The second day held a long flat stage back to the Flemish coast, with a finish in Koksijde. The third day consisted of two stages that both started and finished in De Panne, of which the final stage was an individual time trial. Raced from Tuesday to Thursday, it was the last Flemish race ahead of the Tour of Flanders and was considered a desirable preparation for the main event on Sunday. Eric Vanderaerden, a strong sprinter and time triallist, won the race five times in the late 1980s and early 1990s.

Three Days of Bruges–De Panne
Since 2018, the Three Days of De Panne is raced under a new format following a calendar switch with Dwars door Vlaanderen. The race comes one week earlier, in the week following Milan–San Remo, and the men's event has morphed into a one-day race on Wednesday. The Flemish Ardennes roads and the concluding time trial were abandoned in favour of a route entirely in the province of West Flanders. The iconic Kemmelberg and several cobbled sectors have a more prominent part in the new course.

In order to continue the multi-day format, a women's event was inaugurated on the day after the men's race. Both races start in Bruges and have two finishing circuits in and around De Panne. The women's race is part of the UCI Women's World Tour, cycling's top tier professional competition. Jolien D'Hoore won the first running of the women's Three Days in a sprint.

Winners

Men's race

Multiple winners

Wins per country

Women's race

Wins per country

Notes

References

External links 
 CyclingNews.com coverage
 
 

 
Sport in West Flanders
Cycle races in Belgium
Recurring sporting events established in 1977
1977 establishments in Belgium
UCI Europe Tour races
De Panne
Sport in Koksijde